1999 Empress's Cup Final was the 21st final of the Empress's Cup competition. The final was played at National Stadium in Tokyo on January 16, 2000. Tasaki Perule FC won the championship.

Overview
Tasaki Perule FC won their 1st title, by defeating defending champion Prima Ham FC Kunoichi on a penalty shoot-out.

Match details

See also
1999 Empress's Cup

References

Empress's Cup
1999 in Japanese women's football
Japanese Women's Cup Final 1999